Welcome to Happiness is a 2015 American comedy film written and directed by Oliver Thompson and starring Kyle Gallner, Olivia Thirlby, Nick Offerman, Keegan-Michael Key, Brendan Sexton III and Josh Brener. It was released on May 20, 2016, by FilmBuff.

Plot
Woody Ward (Gallner) is a writer of children's books whose rented apartment has a door in the closet that people can go through to undo mistakes they have made in their lives. When his career and romantic life both hit crises, he becomes dissatisfied that he himself cannot go through it.

Cast 
Kyle Gallner as Woody
Olivia Thirlby as Trudy
Nick Offerman as Moses
Keegan-Michael Key as Proctor
Brendan Sexton III as Nyles
Josh Brener as Ripley
Molly Quinn as Lillian
Paget Brewster as Priscilla
Frances Conroy as Claiborne
Bess Rous as Leah
A.J. Trauth as Penley
Robert Pike Daniel as Osmond
Chauntal Lewis as Farrah
Alexander Wright as Wayfarer

Release
The film premiered at the Newport Beach Film Festival on April 27, 2015. It was released on May 20, 2016, by FilmBuff.

Following the premiere, Kino Lorber bought the rights to release it on DVD.

Reception
On review aggregator website Rotten Tomatoes the film has an approval rating of 31% based on 16 critics, with an average rating of 4.90/10. On Metacritic, Welcome to Happiness holds an approval rating of 29 out of a 100 based on 6 critics, indicating "generally unfavorable reviews".

Matt Fagerholm of RogerEbert.com gave the film 2 out of 5, while Jared Mobarak of The Film Stage gave it a "C+".

Neil Genzlinger of The New York Times called  Welcome to Happiness "an airy fantasy of a film" as well as "a little too determined to be eccentric".

References

External links

2015 comedy films
American comedy films
Orion Pictures films
2010s English-language films
2010s American films